Nance is a hamlet southwest of Carbis Bay in west Cornwall, England.

References

Hamlets in Cornwall